The prehensile-tailed rat (Pogonomys mollipilosus) is a species of rodent that can be found in New Guinea and Australia; it occurs in the tropical rainforest of Queensland.

References

Pogonomys
Mammals of Queensland
Rodents of New Guinea
Rodents of Australia
Taxa named by Wilhelm Peters
Taxa named by Giacomo Doria
Mammals described in 1881